The Abduction of Helen may refer to one of two paintings:
 The Abduction of Helen (Genga), c.1510 painting by Genga
 The Abduction of Helen (Reni), 1628-1629 painting by Reni